Yackandandah  is a small tourist town in northeast Victoria, Australia. It is near the regional cities of Wodonga and Albury, and is close to the tourist town of Beechworth.

History 
The indigenous people of the area prior to white colonization were  the Dhudhuroa people, in  whose language the toponym  Yackandandah is said to have meant “one boulder on top of another at the junction of two creeks”, namely the Yackandandah and Commissioner creeks' intersection.

The area was first opened to white settlement when James Osborne took up land at Osborne's Flat in 1844. On the discovery of gold deposits on its territory in 1852, it became a gold mining centre known for its alluvial wet mining techniques. Yackandandah Post Office opened on 13 June 1856. Another office nearby, Yackandandah Junction, opened in 1872 but closed in 1885.

In his local book, Antony O'Brien (p. 22) quotes an old poem published in the Melbourne Punch, 11 June 1857, titled, "The Lass of Yackandandah".

Today
The area is now predominantly a dairy farming and forestry region and has numerous bed and breakfast lodges which allow its many visitors to enjoy the peace and tranquillity of the district's forest and mountains. It is close to achieving self-sufficiency in energy supply, foreseen to be reached by 2024,  based on solar power.

The town is affectionately known as "Yack".
 
The commercial center of the town, known as the Yackandandah Conservation Area, is recorded on the Register of the National Estate.

Sports & Recreation

Golfers play at the course of the Yackandandah Golf Club on Racecourse Road.

The Yackandandah Cricket Club play in both junior and senior grades in the Cricket Albury Wodonga competition.

Yackandandah Football / Netball Club
The town has had an active Australian rules football team since its first club meeting in 1881 and have competed in the Tallangatta & District Football League, since 1945, winning senior football premierships in 1964 and 2000.

Football Timeline

 1906 - Murphy's Albion Hotel Football Competition
 1912 - Yackandandah & District Football Association
 1913 - 1915: Club active, but did no play in an official competition.
 1916 - 1923: Club in recess
 1924 - 1927: Kiewa & District Football Association
 1928 - 1932: Yackandandah & District Football Association
 1933 - 1935: Chiltern & District Football Association 
 1936 - 1939: Dederang & District Football Association
 1940: Yackandandah & District Football League
 1941 - 1944: Club in recess. WW2
 1945 - 1953: Yackandandah & District Football League
 1954 - Chiltern & District Football Association
 1955 - Yackandandah & District Football League
 1956 - Chiltern & District Football Association
 1957 - 2022: Tallangatta & District Football League

Football Premierships
Seniors
 Murphy's Albion Hotel Football Association
1906 - Yackandandah
Yackandandah & District Football League
1928 - Yackandandah: 7.16 - 58 defeated Kergunyah: 8.3 - 51
1940 - Yackandandah: 13.12 - 90 defeated Mudgegonga: 5.9 - 39

Tallangatta & District Football League
 1964 - Yackandandah defeated Mitta United
 2000 - Yackandandah defeated Barnawartha

Rail
The Yackandandah railway line once linked Yackandandah to Beechworth and opened in 1891.  The route to Woorragee and from there to Yackandandah was steep; trains descending the last gradient into Yackandandah would halt (near the now Yackandandah turnoff, from the Beechworth-Wodonga Road) so the guard could apply hand-brakes to carriages and wagons. The last train on the Yackandandah-Beechworth line was in July 1954.  Though the line was torn up, many sections of the original right of way are visible from the roadway between Beechworth and Yackandandah. In May 2017 the Victoria State Government budgeted for an extension of the Murray to Mountains Rail Trail side branch from Beechworth to Yackandandah. The side branch currently extends from Beechworth to Everton Station, where it connects to the main trail.

Culture
Used for the filming of the 2003 film Strange Bedfellows (starring Michael Caton and Paul Hogan). Yackandandah is home to the annual Yackandandah Folk Festival attracting local, Australian and international artists since 1998. Like the larger neighboring town of Beechworth, Yackandandah promotes itself as a tourist destination on the basis of its gold mining history and features a period streetscape as well as an increasing number of antique shops.

Two historic buildings, the 146-year-old museum (formerly the Bank of Victoria) and an adjacent timber store ("Rainbow Crystal"), were destroyed by a fire in the early morning of 21 December 2006. A real estate agency was also severely damaged. The museum was rebuilt, reopening in November 2008.

Notable people
Sir Isaac Isaacs, Governor General of Australia, who though born in Melbourne spent most of his early years in Yackandandah.

Further reading
O'Brien, Antony. Shenanigans on the Ovens goldfields: The 1859 election, Artillery Publishing, Hartwell, 2005.
Larsen, Wal. The Mayday Hills Railway, Wal Larsen, Bright, 1976.

References

External links

The Official Yackandandah Tourism (Indigo Shire) Web Site
Arts Yackandandah
Yackandandah Folk Festival home page.
yackandandah.com

Towns in Victoria (Australia)
Shire of Indigo
Mining towns in Victoria (Australia)